Randi Heesoo Griffin (born September 2, 1988) is an ice hockey player who competed in the 2018 Winter Olympics as part of the Unified Korea women's national team, scoring its first goal on February 14. In 2018, she was listed as one of BBC's 100 Women.

Background
Griffin was born in the United States to Tom and Liz Griffin. Her mother, Liz, is Korean. Griffin is a native of Apex, North Carolina.

Griffin aspired to compete at the Winter Olympics after she watched women's hockey make a debut at the 1998 Winter Olympics in Nagano, Japan. Her parents decided to let her play ice hockey in Cary, North Carolina and bought her first set of hockey gear.

Playing career

NCAA
She attended Harvard University and played for the university's women's hockey team. She is a letter winner from 2006 to 2010. Griffin played in 125 career games for Harvard and scored 21 goals and made 18 assists for 39 points. After graduating from Harvard, she became a youth ice hockey coach mentoring boys and girls ages 12 to 19. In 2013, she began pursuing a PhD degree in evolutionary anthropology at Duke University.

Korean national team
She was contacted by the Korea Ice Hockey Association in 2014. The association was looking for players with Korean heritage which could represent South Korea in the 2018 Winter Olympics. She played in exhibition games against Kazakhstan for South Korea in 2015. In the Olympic tournament, Griffin scored the first of two goals in the entire tournament by the unified Korean team, in the 4–1 defeat to Japan at the group stage (the other being scored by Han Soo-jin in the seventh place match against Sweden).

Professional
On July 11, Griffin signed her first professional contract, agreeing to join the NWHL's Connecticut Whale.

References

1988 births
Living people
American people of South Korean descent
American sportspeople of Korean descent
South Korean people of American descent
Duke University alumni
Harvard University alumni
Ice hockey players at the 2018 Winter Olympics
Olympic ice hockey players of South Korea
People from Apex, North Carolina
South Korean women's ice hockey forwards
Winter Olympics competitors for Korea
Harvard Crimson women's ice hockey players
Ice hockey people from North Carolina
American women's ice hockey forwards
Connecticut Whale (PHF) players
BBC 100 Women